The Chelan Mountains, or Chelan Range is a mountain range in the U.S. state of Washington. Located west of the Columbia River, north of the Entiat River, and south of Lake Chelan, the range is part of the North Cascades section of the Cascade Range.

The Chelan Mountains stretch south to the Columbia River between the Entiat River and the Chelan River. The northern end the Chelan Range merges with the northern end of the Entiat Mountains. Most of the range is within Wenatchee National Forest. The northern end is part of the Glacier Peak Wilderness.

Other major peaks include Emerald Peak, Saska Peak, Pinnacle Mountain, Pyramid Mountain, and Gopher Mountain. They are all located in the northern part of the Chelan Range.

The range's name comes from the Chelan tribe. A large number of place names, including many of  the mountain names, were given by Albert H. Sylvester.

See also
 List of mountain ranges
 List of mountain ranges in Washington

References

External links
 
 , U.S. Geological Survey

Cascade Range
North Cascades of Washington (state)
Mountain ranges of Washington (state)
Landforms of Chelan County, Washington